Keegan Messing (born January 23, 1992) is a Canadian-American figure skater. Representing Canada, he has competed at two Winter Olympic Games in 2018 and 2022. He has also appeared at three World Championships, placing as high as sixth. He is the 2023 Four Continents silver medalist, 2021 CS Golden Spin of Zagreb champion, a two-time Nebelhorn Trophy champion (2018 and 2022), and a two-time Grand Prix medalist. At the national level, he is a two time Canadian national (2022 and 2023) champion.

Previously, representing the United States, he was the two-time International Cup of Nice champion (2011, 2012) and the 2012 Nebelhorn Trophy bronze medalist. He placed fourth at the 2010 World Junior Championships.

Personal life 
Keegan Messing was born on January 23, 1992, in Girdwood, Anchorage, Alaska, USA. He has two brothers, Paxon and Tanner; Paxon was killed in a motorcycle accident at age 26, in 2019. Keegan holds dual U.S. and Canadian citizenship; his mother was born in Edmonton, Alberta, Canada, and he is a great-great-grandson of Manzo Nagano, the first Japanese person to officially immigrate to Canada. His father is a firefighter.

In October 2018, he became engaged to his girlfriend Lane Hodson. Messing and Hodson married in the summer of 2019. Their son Wyatt was born in July 2021. Their second child, a daughter, was born in January 2023.

Career

Early career

Messing started skating at age 3 after watching the 1994 Winter Olympics in Lillehammer. Naming Elvis Stojko as his biggest influence, Messing said: "Watching him skate made me want to skate". In addition to singles, Messing formerly competed in pair skating with Ellie Gottstein.

Anne Durham coached Messing from 1995 to 1999. He is now coached by Ralph Burghardt in Anchorage, Alaska.

Messing won the junior silver medal at the 2009 U.S. Championships. The following season, he made his senior national debut, finishing ninth. He finished eighth at the 2011 U.S. Nationals.

Messing won the 2011 Coupe de Nice after placing first in the short program and fourth in the free. He then placed seventh at the 2012 U.S. Nationals, which would be his highest placement as an American senior. He won the bronze medal at the 2012 Nebelhorn Trophy, and repeated as the victor at the 2012 Coupe de Nice.

At the 2013 U.S. Nationals, Messing placed sixteenth, followed by a twelfth-place finish the following year.

In July 2014, Messing said that he would begin competing for Canada. In the 2014–15 season, he won bronze at the Skate Canada Challenge and qualified for the 2015 Canadian Championships. He placed fifth at Nationals, representing a club in Sherwood Park, Alberta.  

In the 2015–16 season, Messing placed fifth at the 2015 CS Ondrej Nepela Trophy and eleventh at the 2015 Skate Canada International, his senior Grand Prix debut.  He went on to place sixth at the 2016 Canadian Championships.

The 2016–17 season saw Messing compete at two Challenger events, placing fourth at the 2016 CS Autumn Classic International and winning a bronze medal at the 2016 CS Golden Spin of Zagreb.  He again placed fifth at the 2017 Canadian Championships.

2017–2018 season: Olympic and Worlds debut

Messing began the Olympic season at the 2017 CS Autumn Classic International, where he won the bronze medal behind Javier Fernandez and Yuzuru Hanyu. Competing on the Grand Prix circuit, he placed eighth at the 2017 Skate Canada International and fifth at the 2017 NHK Trophy.

Competing at the 2018 Canadian Championships that would decide the nation's delegation to the 2018 Winter Olympics, Messing placed third in both the short program and free skate, winning the silver medal behind Patrick Chan. Messing was named along with Chan to the Olympic team, as well as to the 2018 World Championships team alongside national bronze medallist Nam Nguyen.

Competing at the 2018 Winter Olympics in PyeongChang, South Korea, Messing finished twelfth overall.  At his World Championships debut, Messing placed sixth in the short program with a new personal best score, qualifying for the final flight of the free skate.  Messing placed eleventh in the free skate following errors for an eighth-place finish overall.

2018–2019 season: Challenger gold, Grand Prix silver
Beginning the season at the 2018 CS Nebelhorn Trophy, Messing placed first in both segments to win the gold medal, his first international win while representing Canada.

Competing on the Grand Prix, Messing placed first in the short program at the 2018 Skate Canada International, following mistakes by presumed frontrunner Shoma Uno.  He then placed second in the free skate, behind Uno, to win the silver medal overall, his first Grand Prix medal.  At the 2018 Rostelecom Cup, he placed fifth, having placed seventh in the short program and sixth in the free program.  He was initially named as the first alternate to the Grand Prix Final and was subsequently called up following the withdrawal of Yuzuru Hanyu due to injury.

At the Final, Messing underrotated two jumps in the short program, placing sixth.  He moved up to fifth place in the free skate, despite falling on a triple Axel and doubling a planned quadruple toe loop.  Messing landed the quad Lutz in competition for the first time, the second Canadian skater to do so after Stephen Gogolev.

At the 2019 Canadian Championships, Messing was considered a favourite going in but struggled in both programs.  In the short program, he placed second behind Gogolev, despite falling on his opening quad attempt.  The free skate was also a challenge, and he dropped to third place, winning the bronze medal behind Nguyen and Gogolev. He was named to the Canadian teams for the Four Continents and World Championships.

At the 2019 Four Continents Championships, Messing placed fifth in the short program after rough landings on his triple Axel and triple Lutz jumps.  He then placed third in the free program with a personal best score, winning a small bronze medal and placing fourth overall.  At the 2019 World Championships, Messing placed fifteenth after two error-riddled programs. The placements of Messing and Nguyen meant that Canada would have only one men's berth at the 2020 World Championships.  Messing concluded the season at the 2019 World Team Trophy, where he placed sixth overall among the twelve men, including a fourth-place free skate that featured only one error.

2019–2020 season
Messing selected "Perfect" as his short program music for the season in commemoration of his marriage, the song having been the first dance at his wedding.  His first competition of the season was the 2019 CS Autumn Classic International, where he won the bronze medal with third-place finishes in both segments.  Messing held the Japanese flag in aid of the event's winner, Yuzuru Hanyu, during the medal ceremony and was praised in the media for an example of good sportsmanship.  

Messing's younger brother Paxon was killed in a road accident days after the Autumn Classic. Messing opted to compete on the Grand Prix a few weeks later.  Messing placed third in the short program at 2019 Skate America, fractions of a point behind Dmitri Aliev, and set a new personal best.  He struggled in the free skate, placing eighth and dropping to fourth place overall. Messing performed a tribute to Paxon at the Skate America gala, saying it felt like "a last goodbye."  At his second Grand Prix, the 2019 Cup of China, he was fifth in the short program after falling on his quad toe loop and performing only a double Axel instead of a triple.  He was third in the free skate and finished fourth overall.

Making only an error on his final triple Lutz, Messing placed first in the short program at the 2020 Canadian Championships.  He struggled in the free skate, falling on both his attempted quad jumps and making a number of other errors, and dropped to third place overall behind Roman Sadovsky and Nguyen. Skate Canada assigned all three podium finishers to compete at the 2020 Four Continents Championships, declining for the time being to fill Canada's one berth at the 2020 World Championships.

At Four Continents, Messing placed fourth in the short program with a clean program, which he cited as especially meaningful given his six-month wedding anniversary.  He struggled in the free skate, making several jump errors that dropped him to eighth place overall, with Nguyen, the highest-finishing Canadian skater, at sixth.

2020–2021 season: Pandemic
The onset of the coronavirus pandemic disrupted Messing's normal plans, including touring and spending time in Canada with choreographers and the national team.  He was assigned to the 2020 Skate America event on the Grand Prix circuit, following the decision of the ISU to base assignments largely on training location.  Following the cancellation of the 2020 Skate Canada International event due to the pandemic and teammate Stephen Gogolev's withdrawal from Skate America, Messing was the only Canadian skater remaining with a Grand Prix assignment that year.  Messing placed third in the short program despite putting a hand down on his open quadruple jump and stumbling in his footwork.  Delivering a strong free skate with only two minor jump errors, he won the bronze medal, his second Grand Prix medal, which he dedicated to his fellow Canadian skaters who were unable to compete on the Grand Prix.

Due to the difficulty of hosting in-person events, the 2021 Canadian Championships were cancelled.  Messing also did not participate in the 2021 Skate Canada Challenge, a virtual qualifying competition.

On February 25, Messing was announced as Canada's lone men's entry to the 2021 World Championships in Stockholm. The stakes for his performance were high, as this was the primary qualifier for the 2022 Winter Olympics in Beijing and the only means for a country to earn more than one berth per discipline, which Messing would later call "quite a heavy burden." Messing placed fifth in the short program with a clean skate. In the free skate, he made only two errors at the end of the program, stepping out of a triple Axel and doubling a planned triple flip. He was sixth in that segment and placed sixth overall. His performance guaranteed Canada one men's entry to the Olympics and the opportunity to qualify for a second one at the 2021 Nebelhorn Trophy.

2021–2022 season: National title and Beijing Olympics
In celebration of the birth of his son Wyatt, Messing selected "Home" by Phillip Phillips for his free program music.

Messing made his season debut at the 2021 CS Finlandia Trophy, where he placed first in the short program.  He struggled in the free skate, placing seventh in that segment, and dropped to fourth overall.  Despite this, he called the event "a great stepping stone for the rest of the season." On the Grand Prix at the 2021 Skate Canada International, he placed third in the short program but again struggled in the free skate and dropped to fifth overall. He was sixth at his second event, the 2021 Internationaux de France, producing his best free skate score of the season to date. Assessing his performance, Messing said that he "had slow start to the season as it's taken me time to figure things out. After Skate Canada, we decided to work on the long program and have a better strategy. It's still not perfect, but I feel like we are on the right track now." 

Journeying from Alaska to Ottawa for the 2022 Canadian Championships in the midst of restrictions prompted by the Omicron variant, Messing's skates were initially lost in transit. He initially attempted to practice with a new pair of skates but had his original skates arrive in time for the beginning of competition on Friday. He placed first in the short program despite singling his triple Axel. Messing also won the free skate despite a few jump errors, finally winning the Canadian national title. He was named to his second Canadian Olympic team and indicated that he had not yet decided whether it would be his final year of competitive skating.

Messing was originally scheduled to travel to Beijing with the bulk of the Canadian figure skating delegation. However, on February 1, it was reported that he had been unable to fly to China at that point due to the need to produce two negative PCR tests and that, as a result, his expected participation in the team event was especially in jeopardy. Messing was eventually cleared to fly to travel to China via Montreal and Milan, arriving on Monday, a day in advance of the men's event. Five hours after arriving, he attended a practice session. His travails received significant media coverage. In the short program, Messing landed all his jumps successfully but lost his balance at multiple points during the step sequence, earning a score of 93.24 points to finish ninth in the segment. He extolled the importance of "keeping the happy-go-lucky attitude. To hop on Olympic ice and to put out a performance I can be happy with, it means a lot." Tenth in the free skate, with his main error being tripling a planned quad toe loop, Messing finished eleventh overall. He said he had hoped to remain in the top ten, but that "it wasn't in the cards, but at the same time, I can still leave here happy. This is still a program I can be proud of." He announced afterward that he intended to compete for one more season, hoping to attend the next edition of the World Team Trophy.

Messing concluded his season at the 2022 World Championships, in a men's field considerably more open than usual due to the absences of Nathan Chen and Yuzuru Hanyu and the International Skating Union banning all Russian athletes due to their country's invasion of Ukraine. He was ninth in the short program but dropped to fourteenth after a rough free skate.

2022–2023 season
Beginning the season at the 2022 CS Nebelhorn Trophy, Messing was third after the short program, where he performed poorly. A strong free skate carried him to the gold medal, and he noted afterward that it had been "a constant battle to overcome the nerves. In the short program, the nerves won. In the free skate, I was able to conquer them and put out a solid performance." He also shared the Fritz Geiger Trophy with the rest of the Canadian delegation as the top country in the competition.

Messing commenced his planned final Grand Prix at the 2022 Skate Canada International. After a quad toe loop fall in the short program, he was fourth in that segment. He was third in the free skate but narrowly remained fourth overall, 0.31 points behind the bronze medalist Matteo Rizzo. Messing said afterward that he "couldn't have asked for a better skate" in the free and that he was "not skating for a medal but for myself this year." In his final Grand Prix appearance at the 2022 Grand Prix of Espoo, he finished fourth in the short program but dropped to eighth after a twelfth-place free program.

The 2023 Canadian Championships coincided with the due date for Messing's second child, but he opted to travel with his parents to compete there. He placed first in the short program by over eight points. He was second in the free skate after a number of jump errors at the beginning of his program, but remained first overall and won his second consecutive Canadian title. He departed immediately after the medal presentations, not staying for the gala the following day. Messing called the experience "such a joyous, sad, emotional whirlwind that I could not have ended on a better note. I could hang up my skates right now and just be happy forever." He subsequently was able to return to Girdwood in time for the birth of his daughter.

Despite falling on his open quad attempt in the short program of the 2023 Four Continents Championships, Messing placed second in the segment with a season-high international score of 86.70, winning a silver small medal. He was 5.20 points back of segment leader Kao Miura of Japan, and only 0.06 ahead of third-place American Jimmy Ma. In the free skate, Messing was the penultimate skater, and produced a clean program, receiving a new personal best score in free (188.87) and overall (275.57), and a standing ovation from the crowd. He finished segment overall in the segment, narrowly behind Miura, and won the silver medal. On winning his first ISU championship medal, Messing remarked that "it took me 28 years of skating to get here."

Programs

Competitive highlights 
GP: Grand Prix; CS: Challenger Series; JGP: Junior Grand Prix

For Canada

For the United States

Detailed results
Small medals for short and free programs awarded only at ISU Championships.  Current personal bests in bold. Historical ISU personal bests in italics.

Senior career

References

External links 

 
 
 Keegan Messing at U.S. Figure Skating

1992 births
Living people
Sportspeople from Anchorage, Alaska
Figure skaters from Edmonton
Canadian male single skaters
American male single skaters
Canadian sportspeople of Japanese descent
American people of Canadian descent
American sportspeople of Japanese descent
Figure skaters at the 2018 Winter Olympics
Olympic figure skaters of Canada
Figure skaters at the 2022 Winter Olympics
Four Continents Figure Skating Championships medalists